Rolf Jahn (8 October 1927 – 3 May 2001) was a German footballer who played as a goalkeeper. He played in one match for the East Germany national team in 1957.

References

External links
 

1927 births
2001 deaths
East German footballers
East Germany international footballers
Association footballers not categorized by position